Makaroa is an island in the Gambier Islands of French Polynesia, 8.5 km south of Mangareva within the same lagoon.

Makaroa is uninhabited.  It is a jagged and barren island with a maximum height of 138 m.  to the SSE lies Kamaka Island.

In 2015 a conservation campaign resulted in the eradication of rats from the island.

References

External links

Tahiti Tourism - Map

Islands of the Gambier Islands
Uninhabited islands of French Polynesia
Island restoration